Beresford Valentine Melville, OBE, JP (1857–1931) was British Conservative Party politician who served as Member of Parliament for Stockport from 1895 to 1906.

Born in Shelsley, Worcestershire, the son of the Rev. D. Melville, Canon and Sub-Dean of Worcester, Beresford Melville was educated at Marlborough College and Brasenose College, Oxford.

He was elected in 1895, re-elected in 1900, but stood down in 1906. He was appointed OBE in 1919.

Sources

Craig, F.W.S. British Parliamentary Results 1885-1918
Whitaker's Almanack, 1896 to 1906 editions

Conservative Party (UK) MPs for English constituencies
Politics of Greater Manchester
1857 births
1931 deaths
People educated at Marlborough College
Alumni of Brasenose College, Oxford
English justices of the peace
Officers of the Order of the British Empire